Motherless (Persian: بی مادر, romanized: Bi Madar) is a 2022 Iranian drama film directed and written by Morteza Fatemi. The film screened for the first time at the 40th Fajr Film Festival.

Premise 
The quiet life of Amirali (Amir Aghaee) and his wife (Mitra Hajjar), by one of them insisting on a decision, inadvertently enters into complex trials, dilemmas, and moral hazards. Man gains nothing unless he loses things, and every decision has a price to be paid.

Cast 

 Amir Aghaei as Amirali
 Mitra Hajjar as Marjan
 Pardis Pourabedini as Mahrouz
 Pejman Jamshidi as Mahmoud
 Ali Oji
 Bita Azizoghli
 Sara Mohammadi
 Fatemeh Mirzaei

References

External links
Motherless at IMDb

Iranian drama films
2020s Persian-language films
2022 drama films
2022 films